The Ili (Xiao'erjing: اِلِ حْ; , literally "Bareness") is a river situated in Northwest China and Southeastern Kazakhstan. It flows from the Ili Kazakh Autonomous Prefecture of the Xinjiang Uighur Autonomous Region to the Almaty Region in Kazakhstan.

The river originates from the Tekes and Künes rivers in Eastern Tian Shan. The Ili drains the basin between the Tian Shan and the Borohoro Mountains. Flowing into Lake Balkhash, the Ili forms a large delta with vast wetland regions of lakes, marshes and vegetation.

Etymology
Earlier mentions of Ili river can be traced back to the Mahmud al-Kashgari's dictionary of Turkic languages, the Dīwānu l-Luġat al-Turk (written in 1072–74). In the book, the author defines it in the following way: "Ili, the name of a river. Turkic tribes of Yaghma, Tokhsi and Chiglig live on its banks. Turkish countries regard the river as their Jayhoun (Amu Darya)." The name possibly originated from Uyghur word Il, meaning hook, resembling the river's geographical shape.

Chinese region 

The upper Ili Valley is separated from the Dzungarian Basin in the north by the Borohoro Mountains, and from the Tarim Basin in the south by the Tian Shan. This region was the stronghold of the Qing administration in Xinjiang in the late 18th and 19th centuries. It was occupied by Russia from 1871 to 1881 (from the Yaqub Beg rebellion until the Treaty of Saint Petersburg (1881)).

Presently, the region forms part of Xinjiang's Ili Kazakh Autonomous Prefecture. Until the early 1900s, the city was commonly known under the same name as the river, 伊犁 (Pinyin: Yīlí; Wade-Giles: Ili). Qapqal Xibe Autonomous County in located on the southern side, which is home to many of the China's Xibe people (who resettled there in the 18th century as part of the Manchu Garrison).

. At least two dams have been constructed on the Ili's left tributary, the Tekes River, and the Qiapuqihai Hydropower Station (恰甫其海水电站)  in Tokkuztara County.

Kazakh region 

The Ili is the main watercourse of the Balkhash-Alakol Basin. The region of Kazakhstan partially drained by the Ili and its tributaries is known in Kazakh as Zhetysu ('Seven Rivers'). In Russian it is known as Semirechye (meaning the same).

The Kapshagay Hydroelectric Power Plant was constructed between 1965 and 1970 near Kapchagay in the middle reaches of the Ili River.

The name Tamgaly in Kazakh means "painted" or "marked place" (Tas means "stone").

Ili Delta 

The delta is situated between the Saryesik-Atyrau Desert and the Taukum Desert. An area of 9,766 km2 (3,771 sq mi) within the delta has been designated as a Ramsar Site. This site has 427 species of plants and 345 species of animals, including important populations of rare species (Dalmatian pelican, goitered gazelle, marbled polecat, white-headed duck, red-breasted goose, ship sturgeon, and others). The Ili river ranks third in Kazakhstan after the Irtysh river and the Ural river in terms of water content.

The Government of Kazakhstan plans to join the three sanctuaries Balkash, Karoy and Kukan (situated in the delta) into one National Park. Until 1948, the delta was a refuge of the extinct Caspian tiger. An introduction of the Siberian tiger to the delta has been proposed on account that it is a genetically close relative of the Caspian tiger. A large population of wild boar, the main prey base of the Caspian tiger, can be still found in the delta. There is also a small population of roe deer. In the drier steppes to the south of the delta live saiga antelopes and goitered gazelles.

Reintroduction of the Bactrian deer, another prey of the Caspian tiger, is currently under consideration. Another potential prey species considered to be reintroduced is the Asiatic wild ass.

Historical connections 
The Ili River treaty of 638 AD formalized the division of the Western Turkic Kaganate (552–638 AD) into the Nushibi and the Dulu. It also established the Ili River as the border between the two states. In the 21st century, increasing need for water in both China and Kazakhstan makes the management of the cross-border Ili River a topic of concern for environmentalists and politicians in Kazakhstan (who feel that their country may not get enough water flowing in from China any more).

The amount of precipitation in summer reaches 150-250 cubic meters.

Fishing
On the river, the most popular type of fishing is fishing of catfish, one of the largest aquatic predators, which may reach 5 meters in length and weigh up to 300 kg. Smaller specimens are usually within 50–100 kg.

Gallery

Tributaries 
The main tributaries of the Ili are, from source to mouth:
 Tekes
 Künes
 Kash
 Khorgos
 Charyn, famous for its canyon
 Chilik
 Talgar
 Kaskelen
 Kurty

References 

 Или, река Семиречинской области (The Ili River), in Brockhaus and Efron Encyclopedic Dictionary

Rivers of Kazakhstan
Rivers of Xinjiang
Sites along the Silk Road
International rivers of Asia
Siberian Tiger Re-population Project
Ili basin
Balkhash-Alakol Basin
Tributaries of Lake Balkhash
Ramsar sites in Kazakhstan